The Walmbaria are an indigenous Australian people of Cape York Peninsula in northern Queensland.

Name
The Walmbaria presently represent themselves as Dingaal, and in land claims the Walmbaar Aboriginal Corporation defines the Dingaal they represent as adult people of the Dingaal clan or people or community having a Dingaal patrilineal descent, or who were adopted by such a person, A Dingaal father is someone who descends on their father's side from any of the Baru, Yoren or Charlies families.

Language
The Walmbaria name for their language was, according to Norman Tindale, Yalgawara, which was spoken in two dialect versions, one for the mainland branch, the other for the islanders. Morer recent work has preferred the term Gambilmugu.

Country
Their southern limits were between a site called Alumukuan in Bathurst Bay and the eastern extremity of Charlotte Bay.

People and social organisation
The Walmbaria were divided into two main clans:
 The Wureimnu were principally islanders
 The Tartali. (Bathurst Head)

Their marriage laws were, by the time late ethnographers explored them, based on a two class system, consisting of:
 (A) Owaimini
 (B) Ungawu.

Tindale in his later report states that the Walmbaria were essentially islanders who only came over to the continental mainland, at Bathurst Head and Cape Melville. "on sufferance."

The ritual extraction of a tooth (tooth avulsion) was practiced on both sexes, with the removal of either the right or left upper incisor.

History
The Walmbaria used to be "recruited" for work on luggers that worked the maritime resources of this area. Some Flinders island men were involved in "the Wild Duck massacre" in which four European sailors were killed. Though the tribes are not named, one report from a crew member with Captain Blackwood who landed at a spot just south of Cape Melville in 1843 has provided a linguistic clue. He stated that several Aborigines there were surprised by the captain's dog, and yelling . This word was taken to mean 'dog', but analysis suggests that it was a form of a Barrow Point noun  ('dog's bark'), and a Flinders Island verb  ('to bark'.) The logical surmise is that the Flinders and Barrow Point peoples shared the same areas.

By 1926 a survey found that the Walmbaria remnant which had managed to survive the incursions of white settlement numbered a mere 25, 10 of them male, the rest female, with no children known to exist, the youngest person encountered being 18 years old.

The last survivor of Flinders Island language-speaking Aba Agathi clan was Chinaman Gilbert.

Material culture
The Flinders island Walmbaria and Bathurst Head women used two kinds of mallet for pulping food and breaking oyster shells. Their men manufactured a heavier and thicker ironwood mallet than the otun, similar to the drum gong used in Melanesia, though they also used the normal regional variety employed to this end by the Barungguan and Mutumui.

Alternative names and spellings
 Walmbar
 Yalnga-bar (Yalnga = Cape Melville).
 Alei (saltwater, an Ongwara clan exonym)

Notes

Citations

Sources

Aboriginal peoples of Queensland